is a multi-use stadium in Fukuoka, Japan.  It is currently used mostly for football matches.  The stadium holds 30,000 people.

See also
Best Denki Stadium

References
Stadium information

Football venues in Japan
Athletics (track and field) venues in Japan
Sports venues in Fukuoka Prefecture
Buildings and structures in Fukuoka
American football venues in Japan
1990 establishments in Japan
Sports venues completed in 1990
1995 Summer Universiade
Heiwadai Bowl